The NHRA Summernationals were an annual drag racing event run by the National Hot Rod Association (NHRA).     

The first annual event was held in July 1970, at York U.S. 30 Dragway near York, Pennsylvania. Subsequent events were held at Old Bridge Township Raceway Park, outside Englishtown, New Jersey. After Old Bridge Township Raceway Park ceased all drag racing operations in 2018, the event was moved to Virginia Motorsports Park, just outside Petersburg, Virginia, and the Summernationals endedreplaced by the Virginia NHRA Nationals. In 2020, due to the COVID-19 pandemic, the Summernationals is scheduled to be held at the Lucas Oil Raceway at Indianapolis.

"Dyno Don" Nicholson turned in Ford's first Pro Stock (PS) win in his Maverick at the 1971 Summernationals.
 
"Dandy Dick" Landy made his second, and last, final round appearance at the 1972 event, losing to Bill "Grumpy" Jenkins.

In 1974, "Jungle Jim" Liberman's Vega Top Fuel Funny Car (TF/FC) did a memorable wheelstand. The following year, Liberman scored his sole NHRA national event win, at the 1975 Summernationals. 

At the 1978 NHRA Summernationals, Bob Glidden took Pro Stock in his Ford Fairmont while Denny Savage claimed the TF/FC title, with Ed "The Ace" McCulloch runner-up.

Notes 

Drag racing events
Annual sporting events
July sporting events